Aizik Isaakovich Vol'pert (5 June 1923 – January 2006) (the family name is also transliterated as Volpert or Wolpert) was a Soviet and Israeli mathematician and chemical engineer working in partial differential equations, functions of bounded variation and chemical kinetics.

Life and academic career

Vol'pert graduated from Lviv University in 1951, earning the candidate of science degree and the docent title respectively in 1954 and 1956 from the same university: from 1951 on he worked at the Lviv Industrial Forestry Institute. In 1961 he became senior research fellow while 1962 he earned the "doktor nauk" degree from Moscow State University. In the 1970s–1980s A. I. Volpert became one of the leaders of the Russian Mathematical Chemistry scientific community. He finally joined Technion’s Faculty of Mathematics in 1993, doing his Aliyah in 1994.

Work

Index theory and elliptic boundary problems
Vol'pert developed an effective algorithm for calculating the index of an elliptic problem before the Atiyah-Singer index theorem appeared: He was also the first to show that the index of a singular matrix operator can be different from zero.

Functions of bounded variation
He was one of the leading contributors to the theory of BV-functions: he introduced the concept of functional superposition, which enabled him to construct a calculus for such functions and applying it in the theory of partial differential equations.

Chemical kinetics

His work on chemical kinetics and chemical engineering led him to define and study differential equations on graphs.

Selected publications
. One of the best books about BV-functions and their application to problems of mathematical physics, particularly chemical kinetics.
.
.
.
.
.
.
.
.
.

See also 
Atiyah-Singer index theorem
Bounded variation
Caccioppoli set
Differential equation on a graph

Notes

References

Biographical references
.
. "The Institute of Chemical Physics. Historical essays" (English translation of the title) is an historical book on the Institute of Problems of Chemical Physics, written by Fedor Ivanovich Dubovitskii, one of his founders and leading directors for many years. It gives many useful details on the lives and the achievements of many scientists who worked there, including Aizik Isaakovich Vol'pert.
. A short announce of the "Partial Differential Equations and Applications" conference in celebration of Aizik I. Volpert's 80th Birthday, held in June 2003 by the Center for Mathematical Sciences, including a few biographical details. The conference participants and program can be found at the conference web site .
. The "Mathematics in the USSR 1958–1967" is a two–volume continuation of the opus "Mathematics in the USSR during its first forty years 1917–1957" and describes the developments of Soviet mathematics during the period 1958–1967. Precisely it is meant as a continuation of the second volume of that work and, as such, is titled "Biobibliography" (evidently an acronym of biography and bibliography). It includes new biographies (when possible, brief and complete) and bibliographies of works published by new Soviet mathematicians during that period, and updates on the work and biographies of scientist included in the former volume, alphabetically ordered with respect to author's surname.
.
. "Mathematics in the USSR during its first forty years 1917–1957 is an opus in two volumes describing the developments of Soviet mathematics during the first forty years of its existence. This is the second volume, titled "Biobibliography" (evidently an acronym of biography and bibliography), containing a complete bibliography of works published by Soviet mathematicians during that period, alphabetically ordered with respect to author's surname and including, when possible, brief but complete biographies of the authors.
. "Institute of Problems of Chemical Physics. Fifty years in the trenches" (English translation of the title) is a brief historical sketch of the institute, published in the first volume of the 2004 yearbook.

Scientific references
.
.
 ( for the Princeton University Press).
. "Mathematics in the USSR during its first forty years 1917–1957 is an opus in two volumes describing the developments of Soviet mathematics during the first forty years of its existence. This is the first volume, titled "Survey articles" and consists exactly of such kind of articles authored by Soviet experts and reviewing briefly the contributions of Soviet mathematicians to a chosen field, during the years from 1917 to 1957.

. A masterpiece in the multidimensional theory of singular integrals and singular integral equations summarizing all the results from the beginning to the year of publication, and also sketching the history of the subject.
 (also available as ).
 (European edition ).
.

20th-century Israeli mathematicians
Mathematical analysts
Soviet chemical engineers
Soviet mathematicians
Russian Jews
Jewish scientists
1923 births
2006 deaths
Russian emigrants to Israel
Israeli chemical engineers